Thai Oil Public Company Limited or simply Thaioil is a Thai public company. It is listed on the  Stock Exchange of Thailand (SET). It is a subsidiary of PTT Group. The company was founded on 3 August 1961 as Oil Refinery, Ltd.

Thaioil is the largest oil refinery in Thailand.

References

Oil and gas companies of Thailand
Companies based in Bangkok
Energy companies established in 1961
Non-renewable resource companies established in 1961
1961 establishments in Thailand
PTT group
Companies listed on the Stock Exchange of Thailand